Catacroptera is a monotypic butterfly genus of the subfamily Nymphalinae in the family Nymphalidae found in sub-Saharan Africa. The habitat consists of grassland and savanna. Adults are on wing year round, but from September to April in cooler areas.

Description

The single species, Catacroptera cloanthe, the pirate, has a wingspan of 50 to 63 mm. Its dorsal colour is orange with rows of dark bands in the forewing and blue spots surrounded by darker brown in the hindwing. The underside is brown with greyish stripes. Sexes are similar. There are seasonal forms which differ slightly. The dry-season form has a dark brown underside.

Food plants
The larvae feed on Justicia protracta, Barleria stuhlmanni, Ruellia cordata, Asystasia gangetica, Barleria opaca, Ruellia togoensis, Chaetacanthus setiger, Asclepias and Phaulopsis species.

Subspecies
C. c. subsp. cloanthe – East and southern Africa: Kenya, Tanzania, Zambia, Zimbabwe, Botswana, Eswatini, South Africa (Limpopo, Mpumalanga, North West, Gauteng, KwaZulu-Natal, Eastern Cape, Western Cape)
C. c. subsp. ligata Rothschild & Jordan, 1903 – West Africa: south-eastern Senegal, Gambia, Guinea, Burkina Faso, Sierra Leone, Liberia, Ivory Coast, Ghana, Togo, Benin, Nigeria, Cameroon

References

External links
"Catacroptera Karsch, 1894" at Markku Savela's Lepidoptera and Some Other Life Forms
 Bode, J. (2012), Pirate & Joker Sap Sucking, feeding on sap of Ziziphus mucronata tree, YouTube video

Butterflies described in 1781
Kallimini
Monotypic butterfly genera